Equestrian has been an Asian Games event since 1982 in New Delhi, India.

Editions

Events

Medal table

List of medalists

References 

Asian Games results at FEI

External links
Medallists from previous Asian Games - Equestrian

 
Asian Games
Sports at the Asian Games
Asian Games